"I Am Woman" is a song by American singer Emmy Meli, released on November 18, 2021, through Arista and Disruptor Records. The song went viral on video sharing app TikTok.

Background
Emmy Meli is a singer from California who gained popularity after posting the song to TikTok, where it has over 22 million views. Meli says she wrote the song to "empower women" and called seeing the song resonate with listeners "the most amazing and beautiful thing" she has experienced.

Commercial performance
The song first charted inside the top 75 of the UK Singles Chart at number 67 on 7 January 2022 after amassing a sales total of 5,789 units.

Charts

Certifications

Release history

References

2021 singles
2021 songs
Arista Records singles
Disruptor Records singles
Songs with feminist themes